Évreux Football Club 27 is a French association football club founded in 2009. They are based in Évreux, Normandy and are currently playing in the Championnat National 3, the fifth tier of the French football league system. They play at the Stade Du 14 Juillet Madeleine in the town.

History

The club's relatively late foundation is as a result of a merger between the two local clubs in the city, Évreux AC and ALM Évreux. The merger was initiated by professional football players Mathieu Bodmer and Bernard Mendy. Both players are from the city of Évreux and started their careers at Évreux AC. The merger was officially announced on 15 June 2009 following a meeting held between both club's official. Mathieu Bodmer was installed as president, but, due to his busy football schedule, agreed to give responsibility of the club to Abdel Bouchelagem, who will manage the club, Eric Fouda, who will be the sporting director, and Ossam Benali, who will handle the club's administrative tasks. Following the merger, the new club was inserted into the Championnat de France Amateur 2, replacing the old club, Évreux AC.

In February 2023, former Évreux youth player Ousmane Dembélé made a donation of €100,000 to the club amidst financial difficulties.

Notable coaches
 Abdel Bouchelagem (2009–2010)

References

External links
  
 Archive site

Football clubs in France
Association football clubs established in 2009
2009 establishments in France
Sport in Évreux
Football clubs in Normandy